The 2002 United States House of Representatives election in South Dakota took place on Tuesday, November 5, 2002. Voters selected a representative for their single At-Large district, who ran on a statewide ballot.

Republican primary

Candidates
Bill Janklow, incumbent Governor of South Dakota
Larry Pressler, former U.S. Senator
Timothy Amdahl, South Dakota Superintendent of Public Instruction (former S.D. School and Public Lands Commissioner), Campaign Manager: Scott Layman, from S.D. Legislative District 2
Roger Hunt, South Dakota State Representative
Bert Tollefson

Campaign
With Thune opting to run for the Senate, a competitive race for the Republican nomination occurred. Among the five candidates pursuing the nomination, the most notable included former Senator Larry Pressler and Governor Bill Janklow, the latter of who was personally recruited to run by President George W. Bush and his advisers.

Results

Democratic primary

Candidates
Stephanie Herseth, attorney
Rick Weiland, former aide to Senator Tom Daschle
Dick Casey
Denny Pierson

Campaign
Democrats made a stronger effort to win the seat than in the previous election cycles with the popular Thune choosing to challenge incumbent Senator Tim Johnson rather than seek re-election. Democrats touted Stephanie Herseth, a Law Clerk and member of the prominent Herseth family (which includes several individuals who have been active in South Dakota politics, such as her grandfather Ralph Herseth, a former Governor of South Dakota).

Results

General election

Campaign
Despite Janklow's high popularity as governor, the race was unexpectedly close. Herseth proved to be skillful fund raiser and as a result was able to stay close to her opponent in campaign funds. The polls confirmed the closeness of the race, showing the both of them consistently with single digits of each other throughout the election.

Throughout the campaign, Janklow emphasized his experience and commitment to seeing that the United States was protected from terrorism, while Herseth emphasized the economic issues of South Dakota.

A controversy occurred in regard to an attack ad that was created by the National Republican Congressional Committee which questioned Herseth's roots in the Mount Rushmore state. It pointed to the fact that she had not registered to vote in her home state until the year before, and prior to that had voted in Maryland in 2000. Herseth  accused the ad of being "both inaccurate and offensive." Though Russ Levsen, her spokesman, acknowledged that she had voted in Maryland and reregistered to vote in South Dakota in 2001, however, he pointed to the fact that she had previously been registered in her home state at the age of eighteen and had voted in five elections between 1989 and 1998. The NRCC pulled the ad within less than forty-eight hours in response to the bipartisan criticisms of both candidates. The ad was subsequently replaced with one that promoted Janklow's credentials.

Though Republicans were unsuccessful in defeating Tim Johnson during the concurrent Senate election, however they did succeed in defending South Dakota's U.S. House seat.

Results

Aftermath
Herseth won the seat in a special election less than eighteen months later after Janklow resigned in January 2004 following a conviction of vehicular manslaughter.

References

House
South Dakota
2002